The Church of Oratorio de San Felipe Neri (Spanish: Iglesia del Oratorio de San Felipe Neri) is a church built between 1685 and 1719, located in Cádiz, Spain. It was declared Bien de Interés Cultural in 1907.

References

See also 
 List of Bien de Interés Cultural in the Province of Cádiz
 History of early modern period domes

Bien de Interés Cultural landmarks in the Province of Cádiz
Churches in Andalusia
1719 establishments in Spain